The James Scott Prize Lectureship is given every four years by the Royal Society of Edinburgh for a lecture on the fundamental concepts of Natural Philosophy. The prize was established in 1918 as a memorial to James Scott by trustees of his estate.

References

Scottish awards
Awards established in 1918